Thorpe Bay railway station is on the London, Tilbury and Southend line, serving the Thorpe Bay area to the east of Southend-on-Sea, Essex. Its three-letter station code is TPB.

It was opened on 1 July 1910 by the London, Tilbury and Southend Railway and was originally  named Southchurch-on-Sea, being renamed Thorpe Bay on 18 July 1910. The station and all trains serving it are currently operated by c2c.

Description 
The station has two through platforms, which are connected by an overhead footbridge. Platform 1 is utilised by London-bound trains, and platform 2 is for country-bound trains.

The ticket office has two serving positions and uses the TRIBUTE issuing system. The ticket office is an open wooden counter, without the clear-glass window usually separating ticket office clerks from customers.

Toilets are provided.

Services 

The typical off-peak service frequency is:

 2 tph (trains per hour) westbound to London Fenchurch Street

Thorpe Bay also sees some additional services to and from London Fenchurch Street during peak times. Some trains start here instead of Shoeburyness because of lack of platforms and easier access from the Shoeburyness depot.

References

External links

Railway stations in Essex
DfT Category D stations
Railway stations in Southend-on-Sea
Former London, Tilbury and Southend Railway stations
Railway stations in Great Britain opened in 1910
Railway stations served by c2c
Buildings and structures in Southend-on-Sea
1910 establishments in England